An order of magnitude is an approximation of the logarithm of a value relative to some contextually understood reference value. Orders of magnitude may also refer to:
 Orders of magnitude (acceleration)
 Orders of magnitude (angular momentum)
 Orders of magnitude (area)
 Orders of magnitude (bit rate)
 Orders of magnitude (charge)
 Orders of magnitude (current)
 Orders of magnitude (data)
 Orders of magnitude (energy)
 Orders of magnitude (entropy)
 Orders of magnitude (force)
 Orders of magnitude (frequency)
 Orders of magnitude (illuminance)
 Orders of Magnitude (Information Society album)
 Orders of magnitude (length)
 Orders of magnitude (luminance)
 Orders of magnitude (magnetic field)
 Orders of magnitude (mass)
 Orders of magnitude (molar concentration)
 Orders of magnitude (numbers)
 Orders of magnitude (power)
 Orders of magnitude (pressure)
 Orders of magnitude (probability)
 Orders of magnitude (radiation)
 Orders of magnitude (specific heat capacity)
 Orders of magnitude (speed)
 Orders of magnitude (temperature)
 Orders of magnitude (time)
 Orders of magnitude (voltage)
 Orders of magnitude (volume)